James Samson Lawson (26 March 1886 – 2 September 1962) was a Scottish footballer who played as a right back, primarily for Dundee, before moving to the United States to be a professional golfer.

Career
He was part of the Dundee squad which won the Scottish Cup in 1910 and was selected to play for the Scottish Football League XI in 1912. After a one-year spell at Airdrieonians he quit the game in 1914 and moved to the United States to become a professional golfer, also remaining involved in football as a player with New Bedford Whalers and Bethlehem Steel, and as a coach for the Steel and at Lehigh University.

Over a long career he was a golf club manufacturer, and a country club pro in Chicago, Flint, Texas and Indianapolis, before retiring to Florida. He also served in the Canadian Expeditionary Force in World War I and in the U.S. Army in World War II.

Personal life
Jimmy Lawson was born to George, a farmer who also worked as a gardener and draper, and Elizabeth "Betsy" (nee Will), a domestic worker. Two of his brothers, Fred Reid Lawson (1888–1954) and Herbert Charles "Heb" Lawson (1892–1930) also moved to America to play golf professionally. Herbert also briefly played football at Bethlehem Steel.

References

1886 births
1962 deaths
Association football defenders
Scottish Junior Football Association players
Scotland junior international footballers
Dundee F.C. players
Airdrieonians F.C. (1878) players
Scottish Football League players
Scottish Football League representative players
Scottish footballers
Scottish male golfers
Scottish emigrants to the United States
Canadian Expeditionary Force soldiers
United States Army personnel of World War II
Naturalized citizens of the United States
Lehigh University faculty
Footballers from Angus, Scotland
Golfers from Carnoustie
Neilston Victoria F.C. players